The Sagudates (Sagoudatai) were a South Slavic tribe that lived in Macedonia region, in the area between Thessaloniki and Veria.

History 
The Sagudates were first attested in a Byzantine document of 686 as allies of the Avars and besiegers of Thessalonica in alliance with other South Slavic tribes, the Rynchines and Drugubites. In the 7th century, along with other tribes they were using armed logboats to plunder the coasts of Thessaly. In the 9th century the Sagudates lived in mixed villages with the Drugubites and paid taxes to the Byzantine authorities of Thessalonica.

References 

Slavic tribes in Macedonia
Sclaveni